The Caterpillar D2 is an agricultural tractor manufactured by Caterpillar.  It was introduced in 1938 and was the smallest diesel powered track-type tractor manufactured by Caterpillar.

Overview
The Caterpillar D2 was manufactured from 1938 through 1957 by Caterpillar Inc. in their factory in Peoria, Illinois, USA. The base frame of this model of tractor is a crawler, and it is equipped with five forward gears and one reverse gear. Caterpillar began producing this model (among others) in response to the "New Deal" programs that were initiated by President Franklin Roosevelt to stimulate America's economy. A total of 26,454 D2's were made over the nineteen years they were in production.

See also
List of Caterpillar Inc. machines

References

External links

Caterpillar Inc. vehicles
Tractors